The Great Antonine Altar is a high relief monument discovered in Ephesus dating to around 169 CE. The sculpture depicts The Antonines. Beginning on the far left, Marcus Aurelius is pictured at 17-years-old. Overlapping him, Antoninus Pius stands as a prideful, mature man, bearded, as his father, Hadrian, was known to be. To the right of Antoninus Pius stands Lucius Verus. To his right, we see Hadrian, who cloaks the image of a young woman, Faustina the Younger. She is the daughter of Antoninus Pius and the future wife of Marcus Aurelius. The sculpture is presently housed in the Kunsthistorisches Museum in Vienna.

References

Roman altars
Classical antiquities of the Kunsthistorisches Museum
Sculptures of the Kunsthistorisches Museum
Antoninus Pius
Cultural depictions of Marcus Aurelius
Cultural depictions of Hadrian
Roman sculpture portraits of emperors